Solenopsis carolinensis, the thief ant, is a species of ant in the family Formicidae.

References

Further reading

 

carolinensis
Articles created by Qbugbot
Insects described in 1901